Erin Mae Kellyman (born 17 October 1998) is an English actress. On television, she gained prominence through the Channel 4 sitcom Raised by Wolves (2015–2016) and the BBC series Les Misérables (2018), Don't Forget the Driver (2019), and Life (2020). She has since starred in the Disney+ series The Falcon and the Winter Soldier (2021) and Willow (2022).

Her films include Solo: A Star Wars Story (2018) and The Green Knight (2021).

Early life
Originally from Tamworth, Staffordshire, Kellyman attended Birmingham Ormiston Academy, The Rawlett School and was a graduate of the Nottingham Television Workshop.

Career
Kellyman appeared in Raised by Wolves, written by Caitlin Moran and her sister Caroline Moran for Channel 4. She also appeared in the 2016 BBC sitcom The Coopers Vs The Rest with Tanya Franks and Kerry Godliman, about a trio of adopted children raised by a suburban couple.

Kellyman was cast as the marauder Enfys Nest in Solo: A Star Wars Story in 2018. The role of Nest in Solo: A Star Wars Story has been reported as the "anti-hero we deserve" and "the most important new character introduced in the movie." This role was reported to have given Kellyman "global recognition." For the role Kellyman had to go through three stages of audition. Kellyman only tested with the lead of the film, Alden Ehrenreich, during the third audition, doing both acting and stunt test work.

Kellyman also appeared in the BBC's adaptation of Les Misérables as Éponine alongside Olivia Colman, Lily Collins, David Oyelowo and Dominic West. Kellyman had originally auditioned for the role of Cosette, but was called back for the role of Éponine. Kellyman praised the diversity in the BBC production, admitting she never considered she would be able to play such a role in a period drama.

Kellyman appeared in BBC Two dark comedy series Don't Forget the Driver, starring Toby Jones. In 2020, Kellyman played the role of Maya, a child that comes to live with her distant aunt, in the BBC TV drama series Life.

Kellyman co-stars in the 2021 Disney+ action series The Falcon and the Winter Soldier as Karli Morgenthau, the leader of a radical group called the Flag Smashers, alongside Anthony Mackie and Sebastian Stan.

Kellyman starred as knight-in-training Jade in the 2022 Disney+ series Willow; a sequel series to the 1988 film of the same name. The relationship between Jade and fellow series lead Kit, portrayed by Ruby Cruz, makes the series "the first true franchise on Disney Plus to really center a queer story", according to Polygon.

Personal life 
Kellyman is multiracial and has said she is happy to play characters who have her heritage for representation of women like her.

Kellyman openly identifies as a lesbian. She attended a pride parade in 2019 with her girlfriend, Jordan O'Coy.

Filmography

Film

Television

References

External links
 

1998 births
21st-century English actresses
English film actresses
English lesbian actresses
English people of Irish descent
English people of Jamaican descent
English television actresses
English LGBT actors
Living people
20th-century LGBT people
21st-century LGBT people
People from Tamworth, Staffordshire
Actors from Staffordshire